Young Boys may refer to:

 BSC Young Boys, a Swiss football/sports club based in Bern
 FCM Young Boys Diekirch, a Luxembourg football club
 Young Boys FD, the professional branch of Silkeborg KFUM, a Danish association football club.
 Young Boys Inc., an African-American drug cartel
 A young boy, an adolescent or prepubescent male

See also
 Adolescence